Little River (Maine) may refer to one of the following rivers in the U.S. state of Maine:
 Little River (Androscoggin River tributary)
 Little River (Big Lake)
 Little River (Casco Bay)
 Little River (Damariscotta River tributary)
 Little River (Drakes Island, Maine)
 Little River (Fish River tributary)
 Little River (Georgetown, Maine)
 Little River (Goosefare Bay) in Biddeford/Kennebunkport
 Little River (Kennebec River tributary)
 Little River (Ossipee River tributary)
 Little River (Passamaquoddy Bay)
 Little River (Penobscot Bay)
 Little River (Pleasant River tributary)
 Little River (Presumpscot River tributary)
 Little River (Salmon Falls River tributary)
 Little River (York, Maine)